Fayette Courthouse Square Historic District is a national historic district located at Fayette, Howard County, Missouri.   The district encompasses 35 contributing buildings in the central business district of Fayette.  It developed between about 1828 and 1947 and includes representative examples of Second Empire, Italianate, and Romanesque Revival style architecture. Located in the district is the separately listed Dr. Uriel S. Wright Office. Other notable buildings include the Fayette Public Library (1914), City Hall (1925), New Opera House Block (1903), A. F. Davis Bank (c. 1885), Commercial Bank (1910), The New Century Block Building (1902), Bell Block Building (1883), U.S. Post Office Building (1925), Howard County Jail and Residence (c. 1889-1894), and Howard County Courthouse (1887).

It was listed on the National Register of Historic Places in 1998.

References

Historic districts on the National Register of Historic Places in Missouri
Romanesque Revival architecture in Missouri
Second Empire architecture in Missouri
Italianate architecture in Missouri
Buildings and structures in Howard County, Missouri
National Register of Historic Places in Howard County, Missouri